Eueides is a genus of butterflies of the subfamily Heliconiinae in the family Nymphalidae.

Species
Listed alphabetically:
Eueides aliphera (Godart, 1819) – Juliette
Eueides emsleyi Brown, 1976
Eueides heliconioides C. & R. Felder, 1861
Eueides mereaui (Hübner, 1816)
Eueides isabella (Stoll, [1781]) – Isabella's longwing or Isabella's heliconian
Eueides lampeto Bates, 1862
Eueides libitina (Staudinger, 1885)
Eueides lineata Salvin & Godman, 1868
Eueides lybia (Fabricius, 1775) – Lybia longwing
Eueides pavana Ménétriés, 1857
Eueides procula Doubleday, 1847
Eueides tales (Cramer, [1775])
Eueides vibilia (Godart, 1819)

References

External links

Eueides, Tree of Life

Heliconiini
Nymphalidae of South America
Nymphalidae genera
Taxa named by Jacob Hübner